Yves Ngabu (born 5 December 1988) is a Belgian professional boxer who held the European cruiserweight title from 2017 to 2019.

Professional career
Ngabu made his professional debut on 13 June 2011, scoring a four-round unanimous decision (UD) victory over Jessy Moreaux at Brielpoort in Deinze, Belgium.

After compiling a record of 8–0 (6 KOs) he defeated Christophe Dufaux on 21 June 2014 in Lichtervelde, Belgium, capturing the vacant Belgian cruiserweight title via second-round technical knockout (TKO). After five more wins, four by stoppage, he won his second professional title, defeating Engin Karakaplan on 11 November 2015 in Zwevezele, Belgium, capturing the vacant WBC Francophone cruiserweight title via first-round knockout (KO).

Following two eight-round UD victories – against Isosso Mondo in June and Alexander Kubich in November 2016 – Ngabu was scheduled to face Geoffrey Battelo for the vacant European cruiserweight title on 4 June 2017 in Roeselare, Belgium. Battelo was forced to withdraw through injury after being involved in a car accident, prompting Mirko Larghetti to step in as a replacement. However, after Larghetti was also forced to withdraw two weeks before the bout with an illness, Tamas Lodi was brought in as a late replacement. Ngabu knocked Lodi down in the fourth round before the referee called a halt to the contest, handing Ngabu the European title via fourth-round TKO.

He made two successful defences of the title – a third-round TKO against Geoffrey Battelo in January 2018 and a UD against Micki Nielsen in February 2019 – before facing former British and Commonwealth cruiserweight champion, Lawrence Okolie, on 26 October 2019 at The O2 Arena in London. Ngabu post his title via seventh-round TKO after a left-hook right-hand combination sent Ngabu stumbling across the ring, prompting referee Robert Laine to step in and halt the contest.

Professional boxing record

Personal life
His parents emigrated to Belgium from the Democratic Republic of Congo when his father, professional footballer Jean-Pierre Mbemba-Ngabu, was signed by R.S.C. Anderlecht; he later played for K.S.V. Roeselare during the time he was born.

Yves played in the lower leagues of Belgian football with KSKV Zwevezele as a forward.

References

External links

Belgian male boxers
Cruiserweight boxers
European Boxing Union champions
Sportspeople from West Flanders
Living people
1988 births
Belgian people of Democratic Republic of the Congo descent